Prestrud Inlet is a re-entrant in the south side of the Edward VII Peninsula, at the northeast corner of the Ross Ice Shelf. It was named by the U.S. Antarctic Service expedition (1939–41) in honor of Lt. Kristian Prestrud, leader of Amundsen's Eastern Sledge Party in 1911, who was first to traverse this region.

Prestrud Bank is a bank named in association with Prestrud Inlet.

Inlets of Antarctica
King Edward VII Land